Thala milium is a species of small sea snail, marine gastropod mollusk in the family Costellariidae, the ribbed miters.

Description

Distribution

References

 Rosenberg G. & Salisbury R. (2007). New species of Thala (Gastropoda: Costellariidae) from the Hawaiian Islands, with comments on other Indo-Pacific species. Vita Malacologica, supplement to Basteria, 5: 53–62

Costellariidae
Gastropods described in 1845